Two ships of the United States Navy have been named USS Long Island, after Long Island, New York.

  was a steam trawler purchased by the US Navy 18 April 1917 and sold 1 December 1919
  was a  launched 11 January 1940 and sold 24 April 1947

United States Navy ship names